North Ward is a coastal suburb of Townsville in the City of Townsville, Queensland, Australia.

The suburb is one of the oldest in the city but has undergone significant development over many decades. It is home to some of the city's top attractions including The Strand, the waterpark, and the rockpool.

Geography 

North Ward is home to the beachside area known as The Strand, which overlooks Magnetic Island. The land is mostly flat at close to sea level except for Stanton Hill in the south of the locality which rises to 60 metres.

Kissing Point is a headland at the most northerly part of North Ward.

History 
North Ward is among Townsville's oldest suburbs, dating to the 1870s.

Townsville Central State School opened on 11 March 1869. It celebrated its centenary in 1969.

St Joseph's Catholic Primary School was established on 29 March 1873 by the Sisters of St Joseph of the Sacred Heart.  Following argument between the sisters and the parish priest Father Connolly, the Sisters of St Joseph left Townsville in March 1878. The Sisters of Mercy arrived in November 1878 to take over the operation of the school.

Townsville Grammar School opened on 16 April 1888. It celebrated its centenary in 1988.

The Townsville Golf Club is the oldest golf club in Queensland, having been established at Kissing Point in 1893. The club relocated to Aitkenvale in 1921, and then relocated to Rosslea in 1924.

St Patrick's College was establied by the Sisters of Mercy on 1 January 1904.

Townsville Hospital School provided primary school education for children in the Second Townsville General Hospitalusing a teacher from the Cootharinga Special School. The school opened on 26 August 1974 and closed on 31 March 1994. It was also known as the Cootharinga Special School Hospital Annexe, Townsville Hospital Special School, and Townsville Hospital State School.

Heritage listings
North Ward has a number of heritage-listed sites, including:

 24 Cleveland Terrace: Selhurst (house)
 24 Eyre Street: Second Townsville General Hospital
 Fryer Street: St Josephs Church
 11 Fryer Street: Yongala Lodge
 38-40 Howitt Street: Kissing Point Fortification
 4-6 Oxley Street: former North Ward Defence Complex
 Paxton Street: Queens Gardens
 Paxton Street: School House, Townsville Grammar School
 Stanton Hill: Townsville Astronomical Trigonometrical Station
 45 The Strand: St Patrick's Convent
 11 Victoria Street: Kardinia
 4-6 Warburton Street: Townsville Central State School

Education

Townsville Central State School is a government primary (Prep-6) school for boys and girls at 4 Warburton Street. In 2018, the school had an enrolment of 233 students with 18 teachers (15 full-time equivalent) and 14 non-teaching staff (10 full-time equivalent).

St Joseph's Catholic School is a private primary (Prep-6) school for boys and girls at Fryer Street. In 2018, the school had an enrolment of 363 students with 27 teachers (21.5 full-time equivalent) and 25 non-teaching staff (13.8 full-time equivalent).

Townsville Grammar School is a private secondary (7-12) school for boys and girls at 45 Paxton Street. In 2018, the school had an enrolment of 1193 students with 101 teachers (96 full-time equivalent) and 91 non-teaching staff (61 full-time equivalent).

St Patrick's College Townsville is a Catholic secondary (7-12) school for girls at 45 The Strand. In 2018, the school had an enrolment of 407 students with 47 teachers (41 full-time equivalent) and 26 non-teaching staff (20 full-time equivalent).

Amenities
There are a number of parks in the area:

 Ben Bloom Park
 Castle Hill Road Park

 Queens Gardens 

 Queens Park

 Sister Kenny Park

 The Strand Park

Sport:

Townsville Sports Reserve

References

External links
 University of Queensland: Queensland Places:North Ward

 
Suburbs of Townsville